The Order of Bravery was a Yugoslav gallantry medal, the twenty-third overall Yugoslav decoration.

It was awarded to individuals who distinguished themselves by extraordinary courageousness during war. The vast majority was awarded to Yugoslav Partisans for actions during the Second World War. A total of 120,636 orders were awarded in Yugoslavia.

See also
 Orders and medals of Socialist Yugoslavia
 Orders and medals of Federal Republic of Yugoslavia

References

Sources

Narodni heroji Jugoslavije (People's Heroes of Yugoslavia), "Mladost", Belgrade, 1975 

Awards established in 1943
Socialist Federal Republic of Yugoslavia
Yugoslavia in World War II
Bravery
Awards disestablished in 1999
1943 establishments in Yugoslavia